The Adversary is the debut studio album by Australian deathcore band Thy Art Is Murder. The album was released on 16 July 2010 through Skull and Bone Records. It is the first release to feature vocalist Chris "CJ" McMahon and last release to feature guitarist Gary Markowski and bassist Mick Low. Guitarist Sean Delander replaced Mick Low on bass and Andy Marsh and Tom Brown joined as the new guitarists on the album Hate.

Track listing

Personnel
Thy Art Is Murder
 Chris "CJ" McMahon – vocals
 Sean Delander – rhythm guitar
 Gary Markowski – lead guitar
 Mick Low – bass
 Lee Stanton – drums

Technical staff and artwork
 Michael Low – engineering
 Shane "Buddha" Edwards – mixing, editing
 Toby Learmont – mastering
 Jumali Katani – cover art
 Remy Cuveillier – layout

References

External links 
 

2010 debut albums
Thy Art Is Murder albums